Natalie Kusz (born 1962) is an American memoirist.

Life
She graduated from University of Alaska Fairbanks with a B.A. and an M.F.A. She taught at Bethel College, and Harvard University. She teaches at Eastern Washington University. Her work appeared in O, Harper's, Threepenny Review, McCall's, Real Simple, and The New York Times.

Awards
 1989 Whiting Award
 1999-2000 Radcliffe College's Bunting Institute fellowship
 1995 National Endowment for the Arts fellowship

Works

Anthologies

Reviews
The author of this memoir has suffered so much in her 27 years that writing about it involved a risk. "Road Song" could have been a saccharine tract about the triumph of the human spirit or such a painful tale that even reading it would hurt. Instead it's a calm, reflective affirmation of family love.

References

External links
Profile at The Whiting Foundation

1962 births
University of Alaska Fairbanks alumni
Harvard University faculty
American memoirists
Living people
Writers from Alaska
American women memoirists
American women academics
21st-century American women